AsponA is a small asRNA transcribed antisense to the penicillin-binding protein 1A gene called ponA. It was identified by RNAseq and the expression was validated by 5' and 3' RACE experiments in Pseudomanas aeruginosa. AsponA  expression was up or down regulated under different antibiotic stress. Owing to its location it may be able to prevent the transcription or translation of the opposite gene. Study by Wurtzel et al. and Ferrara et al. also detected its expression.

See also 
 NrsZ small RNA
 SrbA sRNA
 Pseudomonas sRNA

References 

Non-coding RNA